Telebartais a Bangladeshi fixed line operator.  It is a private public switched telephone network (PSTN) operator in Bangladesh.  As of May 2008, total number of subscribers of this operator is 56,424.

History 
Telebarta is branded under jubok phone.

Numbering scheme 

Telebarta uses the following numbering scheme for its subscribers:

+880 36 N1N2N3N4N5N6N7N8

where 880 is the International Subscriber Dialling Code for Bangladesh and is needed only in case of dialling from outside. 

036 is the access code for Telebarta as allocated by the Government of Bangladesh. Omitting +880 will require to use 0 in place of it instead to represent local call, hence 036 is the general access code.

Offers and services 

1. PCO package

2. Corporate package

3. SME package

    Telebarta SME Startup

   
   14 paisa / 10 sec Telebarta _ Telebarta 24 hours
   
   14 paisa / 10 sec  Telebarta _ Others operator 24 hours 

     Migration  process type  SME and send SMS to 7777 numbers

See also 
 Communications in Bangladesh

References 

Telecommunications companies of Bangladesh